Banco de Occidente is one of the largest Colombian banks. It is part of the Grupo Aval conglomerate of financial services in Colombia, owned by the country tycoon of finances, Luis Carlos Sarmiento Angulo (Ranked 285 on the 2009 forbes list of world billionaires).

History

References

External links
 Official Website

Banks of Colombia
Banks established in 1965